Monika Motyčákova (born 2 July 1992) is a Slovak chess player, Woman FIDE master (2010), chess champion of Slovakia (2015).

Motyčákova was born in Ružomberok. She studied Management at the University of Žilina, graduating in 2015.

References 

Living people
1992 births
Sportspeople from Ružomberok
Slovak female chess players